Sezer Özmen (born 7 July 1992) is a Turkish professional footballer who plays as a defender for Etimesgut Belediyespor.

Career
Özmen left FC Metz in the winter 2015.

References

External links
 
 
 
 
 

1992 births
People from Bakırköy
Footballers from Istanbul
21st-century Turkish people
Living people
Turkish footballers
Turkey youth international footballers
Turkey under-21 international footballers
Association football defenders
Beşiktaş J.K. footballers
Çaykur Rizespor footballers
Samsunspor footballers
FC Metz players
Alanyaspor footballers
Yeni Malatyaspor footballers
Adana Demirspor footballers
Ümraniyespor footballers
Balıkesirspor footballers
Turgutluspor footballers
TFF First League players
Süper Lig players
Ligue 2 players
TFF Second League players
Turkish expatriate footballers
Turkish expatriate sportspeople in France
Expatriate footballers in France